China National Aviation Holding Corporation Limited, also known as Air China Group, is a Chinese state-owned enterprise which is the parent company of Air China and Air Macau. The company was formed on 11 October 2002 by the merger of Air China, China Southwest Airlines, and China National Aviation Corporation (Group) Limited.

History

Origins of China National Aviation Holding
The major carrier of China could be traced back to China National Aviation Corporation which was nationalized in 1949. In 1988 Air China and other airlines were formed by the separation of commercial activity and regulating body of the government.

The once defunct aforementioned legal person of the group China National Aviation Corporation, was also re-registered in Hong Kong on 31 August 1984 as a foreign company. The company was re-registered in China in May 1991, which Civil Aviation Administration of China owned 79% stake, Air China, China Eastern Airlines and China Southern Airlines owned 7% each.

On 11 October 2002, the new China National Aviation Corporation merged with Air China and China Southwest Airlines, forming China National Aviation Holding Company under the Law on Industrial Enterprises Owned by the Whole People.

After the merger, China National Aviation Corporation's subsidiaries in Hong Kong still using the name "China National Aviation Corporation (Hong Kong) and "China National Aviation Corporation (Group)."

China National Aviation Corporation

China National Aviation Corporation was acted as a "window company" in the British Colony since 1984, even after the handover of Hong Kong back to China, and ceased to do business in Hong Kong 10 year later (on 10 August 2007). Several subsidiaries were also incorporated in Hong Kong, such as China National Aviation Corporation (Hong Kong) Limited on 4 August 1992 and then China National Aviation Corporation (Group) Limited on 13 June 1995 (CNAC (HK) became its subsidiary) and the subsidiary even used a logo similar to China National Aviation Corporation.

CNAC once owned a significant stake in Dragonair and LSG Lufthansa Service Hong Kong. The stakes, along with 50% stake of Jardine Airport Services (JASL) was transferred to a listed subsidiary China National Aviation Company Limited (former ticker symbol SEHK:1110, incorporated on 3 February 1997). In turn China National Aviation Company Limited was 69% owned by Air China Limited (acquired from CNAC(G)). The stake in Dragonair (43.29%) was acquired by Cathay Pacific in 2006, and China National Aviation Company Limited was also privatized in 2007 by Air China Limited. On 10 June 2008, the 50% stake in JASL was sold back from Air China to CNAC(G).

Dragonair, as at 2016, was a wholly owned subsidiary of Cathay Pacific, which Air China, now a subsidiary of China National Aviation Holding, had a cross ownership between the two listed companies.

CNAC also purchased a building on 10 Queen's Road Central, Central, Hong Kong Island in 1992, known as CNAC Group Building. it was once owned by the listed company China National Aviation Company Limited but sold back to CNAC(G) in 2002. It was sold in 2008 to Shanghai Commercial Bank for HK$1.388 billion. It was demolished to make way for the headquarters of Shanghai Commercial Bank.

U.S. sanctions 
In January 2021, the United States government named China National Aviation Holding as a company "owned or controlled" by the People's Liberation Army and thereby prohibited any American company or individual from investing in it.

Subsidiaries
China National Aviation Holding is the majority owner of several airlines and subsidiaries, including:Airline share ownership and subsidiaries:
 Air Macau (72.25%)
 Air China (53.46%)
 Dalian Airlines (80%)
 Air China Cargo (51%)
 Shenzhen Airlines (51%)
 Kunming Airlines (80%)
 Henan Airlines (51%)
 Shandong Aviation Group (49.4%)
 Shandong Airlines (22.8% direct, 42% via Shandong Aviation Group)
 Sichuan Airlines (10%)
 Cathay Pacific (~20% cross-ownership)
 China National Aviation Company Limited (100%)
 Aircraft Maintenance and Engineering Corporation (75%)

 China Eastern Airlines (11%)
Shanghai Airlines (100%)
 China United Airlines (80%)
 Sichuan Airlines (10%)
 China Cargo Airlines (51%)

Other operations:
 China National Aviation Corporation (Group) (100%)
 China Aircraft Services Limited (40% as the largest shareholder)
 Jardine Aviation Services (50%)

Fleet
As of April 2013, the Air China and subsidiaries fleet consists of the following aircraft.

References

External links
 
 Official website of China National Aviation Corporation (Group) Limited

Airlines of China
Holding companies of China
Air China
China Southwest Airlines
Government-owned companies of China
Companies based in Beijing
Chinese companies established in 2002
Airlines established in 2002
Holding companies established in 2002
Chaoyang District, Beijing